Silesian Opera in Bytom is an opera company in Bytom, Silesia, Poland, that was founded in 1945. Its home is the former City Theatre, designed by architect Albert Bohm,
that was built in Neoclassical style between 1898-1901. 

Adamo Didur was the first artistic director.

References

External links
 Opera Śląska w Bytomiu (Silesian Opera in Bytom)

Buildings and structures in Bytom
Slaska
Tourist attractions in Silesian Voivodeship
Music venues completed in 1901
1945 establishments in Poland
Theatres completed in 1901